Coded Bias is an American documentary film directed by Shalini Kantayya that premiered at the 2020 Sundance Film Festival. The film includes contributions from researchers Joy Buolamwini, Deborah Raji, Meredith Broussard, Cathy O’Neil, Zeynep Tufekci, Safiya Noble, Timnit Gebru, Virginia Eubanks, and Silkie Carlo, and others.

Background 
Kantayya previously directed a documentary titled Catching the Sun and also directed one episode of the National Geographic television series, Breakthrough. She is also an associate of UC Berkeley Graduate School of Journalism. Kantayya said an interview with 500 Global on August 17, 2021, that three years previously she did not even know what an algorithm was. She read the book Weapons of Math Destruction, which describes how artificial intelligence, machine learning, and algorithms can determine outcomes for certain people. She later came across the work of Joy Buolamwini through a Ted Talk.

Summary
The documentary is about artificial intelligence and the biases that can be embedded into this technology. MIT media researcher Joy Buolamwini's computer science studies uncovered that her face was unrecognizable in many facial recognition systems and she worked to find out why these systems failed. She later found that facial recognition programs only worked when she wore a white mask. She goes on to find out about how else artificial technology can affect minorities.

Coded Bias says that there is a lack of legal structures for artificial intelligence, and that as a result, human rights are being violated. It says that some algorithms and artificial intelligence technologies discriminate by race and gender statuses in domains such as housing, career opportunities, healthcare, credit, education, and legalities. Buolamwini and her colleagues were later asked to testify in front of the US Congress about artificial intelligence. Buolamwini subsequently created a digital advocacy group, the Algorithmic Justice League.

Release
The film first premiered at the 2020 Sundance Film Festival in January 2020. It had a limited release on November 11, 2020, before a full release in virtual cinemas across North America on November 18, 2020. The limited release garnered a box office revenue of $10,236. On April 5, 2021, the documentary was made available to stream on Netflix.

Reception

Critical response
On the review aggregation website Rotten Tomatoes, the film holds an approval rating of 100% based on 52 reviews with an average rating of 7.9/10. The website's critical consensus reads, "Clear, concise, and comprehensive, Coded Bias offers a chilling look at largely unseen side effects of modern society's algorithmic underpinnings." On Metacritic, the film has a weighted average score of 73 out of 100 based on seven critic reviews.

In a review written for the New York Times, Devika Girish states "The film moves deftly between pragmatic and larger political critiques, arguing that it’s not just that the tech is faulty; even if it were perfect, it would infringe dangerously on people’s liberties."

Praising the documentary for its "impressive pacing," Nick Allen, writing for RogerEbert.com states "One might expect a documentary about data and algorithms to run a bit dry, but “Coded Bias” defies that by having a lot on its mind and by being quick on its feet, hopping all over the country, and the world."

In the review from the website of the Society for Social Studies of Science, Renee Shelby questioned whether readers understood the power she said was abused through this data collection. She states "Where there is power, there is resistance to power; and the film touches on politics “from above” and “from below.” The film showcases women's activism and social movements (e.g., the Hong Kong Umbrella Movement) fighting to ensure that surveillance and other algorithmic tools are not abused.".

Giving the documentary a 2.5 out of 5 stars, Ashley Sosa, writing for videolibrarian.com, states "The documentary's cautionary message about the dangers of algorithmic bias is presented in an engaging and humanistic way. Technical details are kept to a minimum, which could be viewed as positive or negative depending on prior knowledge and interest."

Accolades

See also 

 Algorithmic Justice League
 Black in AI
 Data for Black Lives

References

External links

American documentary films
2020 documentary films
2020 films
Documentary films about computing
Documentary films about women
Documentary films about racism
Women in science and technology
Existential risk from artificial general intelligence
Ethics of science and technology
Diversity in computing
2020s English-language films
2020s American films